The Meath Senior Football Championship is an annual Gaelic Athletic Association club competition between the top Gaelic football clubs in Meath, Ireland.

Qualification for subsequent competitions
The winners of the Meath Senior Football Championship winners qualify to represent their county in the Leinster Senior Club Football Championship and in turn, go on to the All-Ireland Senior Club Football Championship.

Competition format
From 2020, 16 teams compete in the championship, with four groups of four teams. The top two finishers in each group qualify for the quarter-finals. The bottom two teams in each group progress to the relegation playoffs. The overall loser in the relegation playoffs gets relegated to the Intermediate Division.
In the 2020 Meath Senior Football Championship, due to the short window available to complete the championship because of the COVID-19 pandemic, the Meath county board decided that only the top team in each group would qualify for the semi-finals while only the bottom team in each group would take part in the relegation playoffs.

History
Wolfe Tones went from the Meath Junior Football Championship to Meath SFC winners in the space of four seasons in the early 21st-century, featuring Meath player Cian Ward, whose emergence as one of Meath's "most exciting talents" coincided with this run, while 1996 All-Ireland Senior Football Championship-winning captain Tommy Dowd also joined the club around this time.

In the 2022 final, Ratoath defeated Summerhill 0-12 to 0–11 to win their third Keegan Cup.

Senior teams
The 16 teams competing in the 2022 Senior Football Championship are:

Top winners

Roll of honour

 The 1965 final was abandoned mid-game. Skryne awarded the title.

Records
Most titles: 
20 - Navan O'Mahonys
13 - Skryne
10 - Navan Gaels
Most consecutive titles: 
6 - Bohermeen: 1909-1914
5 - Navan O'Mahonys: 1957-1961
4 - Summerhill: 1974-1977
Most appearances in the SFC
 86+ - Skryne
Most consecutive appearances in the SFC
 84 - Skryne: 1938–present
 62 - Trim: 1949-2011
 54 - Seneschalstown: 1968–present
 51 - Walterstown: 1965-2015
Biggest win
44 points - Kilmainhamwood 10–19, 0-5 St Colmcille's: 1996
35 points - Summerhill 5-27, 0-7 Curraha: 2018
Most points scored
174 - Summerhill: 2019
169 - Ratoath: 2019
168 - Kilmainhamwood: 1996
Most points conceded
161 - Longwood: 2019
153 - Duleek/Bellewstown: 2017
141 - Gaeil Colmcille: 2004
Leinster SCFC titles
2 - Walterstown: 1980, 1983
1 - Dunsaughlin: 2002; Summerhill: 1977

See also
Meath Senior Hurling Championship

References

External links
Official Meath Website
Meath on Hoganstand
Meath Club GAA
Championship Proposal 2012
Meath SFC Winners

 
1
Gaelic football competitions in Leinster
Senior Gaelic football county championships